sbase is a set of programs developed by suckless.org that implements several portable UNIX tools in a minimal way according to POSIX specifications. It is used in Google's Fuchsia operating system to provide standard UNIX utilities.

References

Free software projects
Free computer programming tools
Free software programmed in C
Unix software